Anna Elizabeth Wood (born December 30, 1985) is an American film, stage, and television actress, known for her recurring role on the short-lived NBC television drama series Deception and starring as attorney Jamie Sawyer in the short-lived CBS legal drama series Reckless. She also played "The Woman in Red" in the USA supernatural drama series Falling Water.

Personal life
Anna Wood married actor Dane DeHaan on June 30, 2012, in the Blue Ridge Mountains in Virginia. They met in North Carolina during high school and had been dating since 2006. They have a daughter born in 2017 and a son born in 2020.

Filmography

Films

Television

References

External links
 

American film actresses
American television actresses
Living people
Actresses from North Carolina
1985 births
People from Mount Airy, North Carolina
People from Williamsburg, Brooklyn
21st-century American actresses